Hangar-7 is a building in Salzburg, Austria, hosting a collection of historical airplanes, helicopters and Formula One racing cars, and serving as home for the Flying Bulls, a private aircraft fleet stationed in Salzburg. Hangar-7 is owned by Red Bull founder Dietrich Mateschitz. It houses the Michelin-starred restaurant Ikarus, two bars and a lounge. The building is airfoil shaped, constructed of 1,200 tons of steel and 75,000 sqft of glass surface. "Hangar 8" is the name of the maintenance facility.

Construction
Hangar 7 was designed by renowned architect Volkmar Burgstaller. The steel and glass dome shaped structure was engineered and built by Austrian specialists Waagner-Biro and completed in 2003.

References

External links

 Official English website

Michelin Guide starred restaurants in Austria
Red Bull Racing
Restaurants in Austria
Buildings and structures in Salzburg
Tourist attractions in Salzburg
Dietrich Mateschitz